The following lists events that happened during 2008 in Colombia.

Incumbents
 President: Álvaro Uribe Vélez 
 Vice President: Francisco Santos Calderón

Events

January
 January 10 - FARC guerrillas release Colombian hostages Clara Rojas and Consuelo González.

February
 February 27 - Colombian FARC rebels release four former members of Congress, held hostage since 2001 and 2002, in a deal brokered by Venezuelan president Hugo Chávez.

March
 March 2 - President of Venezuela Hugo Chávez orders the closure of the Venezuelan embassy in Colombia and moves ten battalions to the Colombian-Venezuelan border in response to the killing of FARC leader Raúl Reyes in Ecuador by Colombian armed forces the previous day. Rafael Correa, the President of Ecuador, orders troops to the Colombian border. The Colombian government accuses Correa of having "a relationship and commitments" with FARC.
 March 14 - Colombian Ministry of National Defense Juan Manuel Santos says the government will pay US$2.5 million to Pedro Pablo Montoya, the FARC rebel who killed Iván Ríos.

April
 April 6 - Mark Penn resigns as chief strategist for the Hillary Clinton 2008 presidential campaign. This comes in the wake of revelations that he performed lobbying work for the Colombian government, regarding a free trade pact that Senator Clinton opposes.
 April 14 - The Nevado del Huila volcano erupts in Colombia, causing thousands to evacuate.

May
 May 13 - Colombia extradites 14 former paramilitary leaders, including Salvatore Mancuso, Rodrigo Tovar Pupo, and Diego Murillo Bejarano, to the United States where they have been charged with drug trafficking
 May 15 - Interpol confirms that Colombia did not tamper with computer files in hardware seized from Raul Reyes. This alleged that Venezuela and Ecuador provided funding, assistance and drug routes to the terrorist group Revolutionary Armed Forces of Colombia. However, Interpol stated that they had not looked at the content of the files, only their authenticity.
 May 18 - A senior Revolutionary Armed Forces of Colombia commander known as "Karina" surrenders to Colombian authorities.
 May 24 - A 5.9 earthquake with its epicentre in the Department of Meta strikes the Central and West areas of Colombia; at least 11 people are killed with over 4000 injuries reported.

June
 June 24 - Representing Pope Benedict XVI, Colombian Cardinal Darío Castrillón Hoyos is pressing the traditionalist Society of St. Pius X to accept five conditions, including respect for the pope and his authority, as part of a reconciliation offer.

July
 July 2 - Íngrid Betancourt, held captive by the FARC guerilla for six years, is rescued in an operation by the Colombian government.
 July 20 - The Colombian diaspora celebrates Colombia's Independence Day with concerts and marches against violence, kidnapping and the FARC in Bogotá, Leticia, the country's other 1,119 cities and municipalities, and events in cities around the world including Paris (attended by Ingrid Betancourt), London, Washington, D.C., New York City and Miami.

October
 October 26 - Óscar Tulio Lizcano, a Conservative congressman kidnapped by the FARC in August 2000, is freed by the military in Chocó Department.

November
 November 22 - The government of Colombia confirms that the eruption of Nevado del Huila, a volcano in southern Colombia, has led to at least 10 deaths in recent days and the evacuation of 12,000 people.

References

 
2000s in Colombia
Years of the 21st century in Colombia
Colombia
Colombia